An octave is the interval between one musical pitch and another with half or double its frequency.

Octave may also refer to:

Arts and entertainment
 Octave (album), by The Moody Blues, 1978
 Octave (poetry), a verse form consisting of eight lines of iambic pentameter 
 Sicilian octave
 Ottava rima, an Italian verse form

People 
 Octave (given name) including a list of people with the name
 Octave (musician) (born 1963), Romanian rock musician
 Dieuson Octave (born 1997), American rapper known as Kodak Black

Science and technology
 Octave (electronics), a logarithmic unit for ratios between frequencies
 GNU Octave, a high-level computer programming language
 Octave, an IT risk management method
 Octonion, originally octave, in hypercomplex algebra

Other uses 
 Octave, Arizona, a place in the United States
 Octave (horse) (foaled 2004), a thoroughbred racehorse
 Octave (liturgy), either the eighth day after a feast, or the whole period of those eight days
 Octave celebration, a religious celebration in Luxembourg
 Octave (unit), a British unit for measuring whisky
 Octave, a fictional character in the film Interstella 5555: The 5tory of the 5ecret 5tar 5ystem
 Hurricane Octave, the name of several tropical storms

See also

 

 Octave band, a frequency band that spans one octave
 Law of Octaves, a concept from the history of the development of the periodic table of chemical elements